Cornerville is an unincorporated community in Washington County, in the U.S. state of Ohio.

History
A post office called Cornerville opened in 1890, and was discontinued in 1891. Besides the post office, Cornerville had the Little Muskingum Congregational church, established in 1843.

References

Unincorporated communities in Washington County, Ohio
Unincorporated communities in Ohio